James Patrick Andrews (1 February 1927 – 12 September 2012) was a Scottish footballer who played as a left winger.

Biography
Andrews was born on 1 February 1927 in Invergordon, Scotland. 
He was signed by English club West Ham United from Dundee in November 1951 for £4,750. He played his first game for the club on 24 November 1951, against Everton. His final game for West Ham came against Plymouth Argyle on 31 March 1956. He made a total of 120 League and FA Cup appearances for the Upton Park club. After leaving West Ham, Andrews joined nearby Leyton Orient and scored eight goals in 36 League appearances for them. He later played for Queens Park Rangers, scoring 15 goals in 82 League games, before retiring.

After his playing career ended, Andrews worked as a coach with Queens Park Ranger, Luton Town and Tottenham Hotspur. He became manager of Cardiff City and took them to a double of promotion and Welsh Cup winners in 1975–76. He was sacked in November 1978 and later worked as a scout for Southampton.

Andrews died on 12 September 2012, aged 85.

Managerial statistics

References

External links
 
 

1927 births
2012 deaths
People from Ross and Cromarty
Sportspeople from Highland (council area)
Scottish footballers
Association football wingers
Dundee F.C. players
West Ham United F.C. players
Leyton Orient F.C. players
Queens Park Rangers F.C. players
Cardiff City F.C. managers
Scottish football managers
English Football League players
Scottish Football League players
Southampton F.C. non-playing staff
Association football coaches